KTQM-FM (99.9 FM) is a radio station broadcasting an adult contemporary format.  Licensed to Clovis, New Mexico, United States, the station serves eastern New Mexico and west Texas centered around the Clovis area.  The station is part of the Zia Broadcasting Group and features programming from ABC Radio .

The station was originally put on the air by famed record producer Norman Petty (produced Buddy Holly, The Fireballs and many more).

References

External links
KTQM-FM Facebook

TQM-FM
Clovis, New Mexico